Call Me Crazy: A Five Film is a 2013 American drama anthology television film which premiered on Lifetime on April 20, 2013. It is a sequel to the 2011 film Five.

Plot
An anthology of five short films exploring the impact and stigma of mental illness. Three of the five stories are connected.

Segment Lucy
Directed by Bryce Dallas Howard and written by Deirdre O'Connor.

Lucy follows the film's title character, a law student who finds herself amidst the horror of schizophrenia, landing her in an institution where, through the support of a new friend, meds and her psychotherapist, she begins her path to not only healing, but also a promising future.

Cast
 Brittany Snow as Lucy
 Clint Howard as Harold
 Jason Ritter as Bruce
 Octavia Spencer as Dr. Nance

Segment Grace
Directed by Laura Dern and written by Jan Oxenberg.

Grace explores bipolar disorder through the experience of a teenage daughter whose mother grapples with the condition.

Cast
 Sarah Hyland as Grace
 Melissa Leo as Robin
 Melissa Farman as Izzy
 Aimee Teegarden as Olivia
 Andrea Bendewald as Laura

Segment Allison
Directed by Sharon Maguire and written by Howard J. Morris.

Allison weaves together comedy and family drama in a story about healing when an eldest daughter Lucy, the subject of the first segment, returns home from inpatient treatment and spoils her sister Allison's unveiling of her new boyfriend to their parents.

Cast
 Brittany Snow as Lucy
 Sofia Vassilieva as Allison
 Ken Baumann as Luke
 Jean Smart as Claire
 Richard Gilliland as Hugh

Segment Eddie
Directed by Bonnie Hunt and written by Stephen Godchaux.

Eddie delves into the world of depression as seen through the eyes of a comedian's wife as she grapples with understanding how her husband Eddie, who is so loved, can be so withdrawn and overcome with sadness.

Cast
 Mitch Rouse as Eddie
 Lea Thompson as Julia
 Chelsea Handler as Alex
 Dave Foley as Danny
 Jay Chandrasekhar as Joey
 James Avery as Dr. Beckett
 Ross Mathews as MC

Segment Maggie
Directed by Ashley Judd and written by Erin Cressida Wilson.

Maggie, a female veteran returns home from war to her son and father, only to have her life shattered by the onset of posttraumatic stress disorder and her memories of being sexually assaulted.

Cast
 Jennifer Hudson as Maggie
 Melanie Griffith as Kristin
 Ernie Hudson as Percy
 Brittany Snow as Lucy

Awards and nominations

References

External links
 
 
 

2010s psychological drama films
2013 television films
2013 films
American anthology films
American psychological drama films
American sequel films
American drama television films
Films about bipolar disorder
Films about depression
Films about post-traumatic stress disorder
Films about schizophrenia
Films directed by Bonnie Hunt
Films directed by Sharon Maguire
Films scored by Alex Wurman
Lifetime (TV network) films
Television sequel films
Films directed by Bryce Dallas Howard
2010s English-language films
2010s American films